Oenopotella ultraabyssalis is a species of sea snail, a marine gastropod mollusk in the family Mangeliidae.

There is one subspecies:  Oenopotella ultraabyssalis aleutica A.V. Sysoev, 1988

Description
The length of the shell attains 12.8 mm.

Distribution
This marine species was found in the Kurile-Kamchatka Trench, Northern Pacific

References

 Sysoev, AV. "Ultra-abyssal Findings of Mollusks of the Family Turridae (Gastropoda, Toxoglossa) in the Pacific Ocean" Zoologichesky Zhurnal 67.7 (1988): 965–973.

External links
  Tucker, J.K. 2004 Catalog of recent and fossil turrids (Mollusca: Gastropoda). Zootaxa 682:1-1295.
 Worldwide Mollusc Species Data Base: Oenopotella ultraabyssalis

ultraabyssalis
Gastropods described in 1988